El Pino is one of 18 parishes (administrative divisions)  in Aller, a municipality within the province and autonomous community of Asturias, in northern Spain.

Villages
 Los Coḷḷaínos
 Cuevas
 Felechosa
 El Fielato
 El Pino
 La Pola Vieya / Pola del Pino
 La Raya (Spanish Puerto San Isidro)
 Roseco
 Rufrío

See also
 Church of St. Felix, El Pino

References

External links

Official website 

Parishes in Aller